Laxmikant Parsekar Ministry was the Council of Ministers in Goa Legislative Assembly headed by Chief Minister Laxmikant Parsekar.

Council of Ministers 
 Laxmikant Parsekar (Chief Minister) 
 Francis D’Souza (Deputy Chief Minister)
 Dayanand Mandrekar
 Ramesh Tawadkar
 Mahadev Naik 
 Dilip Parulekar
 Milind Naik
 Alina Saldanha
 Avertano Furtado
 Rajendra Arlekar

Former members 
 Sudin Dhavalikar
 Deepak Dhavalikar
 Francisco Pacheco

References 

Bharatiya Janata Party state ministries
Maharashtrawadi Gomantak Party
Goa ministries
2014 establishments in Goa
2017 disestablishments in India
Cabinets established in 2014
Cabinets disestablished in 2017